Bowman Creek flows into Schoharie Creek by Burtonsville, New York .

References

Rivers of New York (state)
Rivers of Schenectady County, New York